New York subway generally refers to the New York City Subway.

It can also refer to:
 Uptown Hudson Tubes that carry underground PATH trains between New Jersey to 33rd Street
 North River Tunnels to carry trains from New Jersey to Manhattan 
 East River Tunnels to carry trains from Long Island to Manhattan 

Outside New York City:
 Buffalo Metro Rail subway segment in Buffalo, New York
 Rochester Subway, an abandoned subway in Rochester, New York